Burkina Faso is a country of origin, transit, and destination for persons, mostly children, subjected to trafficking in persons, specifically forced labor and forced prostitution. The Government of Burkina Faso provided data from the Ministry of Social Action showing that, in 2009, security forces and regional human trafficking surveillance committees intercepted 788 children Burkinabe and foreign children, 619 of whom were boys, destined for exploitation in other countries, principally Côte d'Ivoire, Mali, and Niger. Child trafficking victims who remain inside Burkina Faso are usually found in large cities such as Ouagadougou, Bobo-Dioulasso, Nouna, and Hounde. Child victims face conditions of forced labor or services as plantation and mining hands, laborers on cocoa farms, domestic servants, beggars recruited as pupils by unaccredited Koranic schools, or captives in the prostitution trade. To a lesser extent, traffickers recruit Burkinabe women for nonconsensual commercial sexual exploitation in Europe. Women from neighboring countries like Nigeria, Togo, Benin, and Niger migrate to Burkina Faso on the promise of respectable work, but are subjected to forced labor in bars or forced prostitution.

The Government of Burkina Faso does not fully comply with the minimum standards for the elimination of trafficking; however, it is making significant efforts to do so, despite limited resources. The number of child victims intercepted in 2009 exceeds by 100 the already high rate recorded in the previous reporting period. Yet massive flooding in September 2009 destroyed many files and computer systems holding data on trafficking investigations and prosecutions during the year. In prior years, the government conscientiously reported such information. Protection and assistance efforts for victims continued to the extent the country's strained resources allowed.

U.S. State Department's Office to Monitor and Combat Trafficking in Persons placed the country in "Tier 2 Watchlist"  in 2017.

Prosecution
The effectiveness of the government's anti-trafficking law enforcement efforts in 2009 was difficult to assess due to a natural disaster's destruction of relevant records. Burkina Faso's May 2008 anti-trafficking law prohibits all forms of trafficking and prescribes maximum punishments for convicted offenders as high as 20 years or life imprisonment; these penalties are sufficiently stringent and commensurate with prescribed penalties for other serious offenses, such as rape. The government has not reported whether successful prosecutions in 2009 led to significantly longer sentences than sentences given to convicted offenders in previous reporting periods. The government claimed to have investigated and prosecuted a number of suspected trafficking offenders in 2009; computerized and paper-based police and court records of these cases were subsequently lost in September 2009 flooding. There was no evidence of government officials' complicity in trafficking, though some corrupt law enforcement agents may have facilitated trafficking-related activity.

Protection
The government was not in a position to provide many services directly to trafficking victims. In 2009, however, the Ministry of Social Action, together with security forces and regional anti-trafficking committees, identified and referred 788 child victims to some of the 23 transit centers jointly funded by the government and UNICEF. The government also provided approximately $85,000 for support and school fees to 50 orphanages and nurseries where the risk of child trafficking was significant – an unusual commitment of support from a government with limited resources. To help foreign victims return to their homes countries quickly, the government processed their travel documents and collaborated with NGOs to ensure a safe return. Burkinabe law permits a victim to seek legal action against trafficking offenders, but official agencies did not report any such cases in 2009, or any instances of victims assisting in the prosecution of suspected offenders. The government does not provide legal alternatives to the removal of foreign victims to countries where they face hardship or retribution. Nationals of ECOWAS states, including trafficking victims, however, may legally reside and work in Burkina Faso. The government made efforts to sensitize law enforcement agents to child trafficking issues during the reporting period, but did not develop official programs to train officials in identifying victims. The prevalence of child trafficking in the country is well known, but officials and private citizens alike have difficulty distinguishing between children who migrate voluntarily for work, and those who are victims of trafficking.

Prevention
Strong partnerships with NGOs and international organizations allowed the Burkinabe government to sustain nationwide anti-trafficking information and education campaigns during the last year. Local and international partners supported workshops and seminars focused on child trafficking, and government and private media aired radio and television programs that impacted approximately 600,000 people. The government distributed thousands of booklets describing the Anti-TI P National Action Plan, but was not able to implement the plan. The mayor of Ouagadougou took some steps to reduce the demand for commercial sex acts by closing 37 brothels in the capital in 2009. The government provided Burkinabe military troops with human rights and trafficking training prior to their deployment abroad as international peacekeepers.

See also
Economy of Burkina Faso
Human rights in Burkina Faso
Mining industry of Burkina Faso

References

Burkina Faso
Burkina Faso
Human rights abuses in Burkina Faso
Crime in Burkina Faso by type